The succession of power in China since 1949 takes place in the context of a one-party state under the Chinese Communist Party (CCP). Despite the guarantee of universal franchise in the constitution, the appointment of the Paramount leader lies largely in the hands of his predecessor and the powerful factions that control the Central Committee of the Chinese Communist Party. 

The appointment of the leader occurred after two five year terms in accordance with the Constitution of the People's Republic of China from 1982 to 2018. This was changed to unlimited terms during the first plenary session of the 13th National People's Congress in March 2018.

In October 2022, Xi Jinping was re-elected as General Secretary of the Chinese Communist Party for a precedent-breaking third term of paramount leader after Mao Zedong's death.

Structure of power
It is generally accepted that the paramount leader (supreme leader) of China holds these three official titles:

General Secretary of the Chinese Communist Party  Head of the ruling party
 President of the People's Republic of China  Nominal head of state
Chairman of the Central Military Commission  Commander-in-chief of the Armed Forces (People's Liberation Army)

In the past it was possible for the Paramount leader to wield absolute power without holding any of the highest offices. This was the case with Deng Xiaoping who was the undisputed leader from 1978 to 1989 without holding any of the highest offices of party and state.  Since his retirement, power has become more structured with the leader holding all three of the previously mentioned offices.

History
The concept of Paramount leader was instituted during the era of Mao Zedong who was Chairman of the Chinese Communist Party for life. The position was further established under Deng Xiaoping, however the term Paramount leader has not been officially attributed to any other leaders. Since the retirement of Deng Xiaoping by resigning from Chairman of the Central Military Commission of the Communist Party in 1989, political power in China has been held collectively by the members of the Politburo Standing Committee of the Chinese Communist Party. The General Secretary may be best described as primus inter pares, first among equals. Because the proceedings of this body are considered a state secret, the inner workings of Politburo are not made public. It is clear, however, that decision making has become consensus driven and that no single figure can any longer act unilaterally as in the days of Mao Zedong and Deng Xiaoping.

Constitutional mechanism
Constitutional power in the People's Republic of China is held by the Central Committee of the Chinese Communist Party (CCCPC).  Although this group of approximately 300 members does not have power in the same way as a traditional legislative body, the most important and senior officials of the Chinese government are all members.

Within the CCCPC is the Politburo of the Chinese Communist Party. This body is a group of 25 individuals (currently 24 men and one woman) who govern the Chinese Communist Party (CCP). Theoretically, the Politburo is elected by the CCCPC; however, in practice any new member of the Politburo is chosen by the current members. Politburo members hold positions in China's national government and regional positions of power simultaneously thereby consolidating the CCP's power.

In the case of key policy decisions, topics are addressed in the Politburo which then determines actions to be taken by the national and local government. The policy direction for the entire country rests in the hands of these 25 individuals who meet together once a month. Admission into the Politburo is extremely difficult. Tight control over the body is exercised by current members who vet potential members carefully to maintain the balance of power. Good political relationships within the Politburo are essential for admittance into the group. All members of the Politburo are elected for five year terms.

20th Politburo In stroke order of surnames, except for members of the Politburo Standing Committee:

Power within the Politburo is further concentrated in the Politburo Standing Committee of the Chinese Communist Party. This group of seven members meets together weekly and is led by the General Secretary.

20th Politburo Standing Committee
Ordered in political position ranking

Xi Jinping
Li Qiang
Zhao Leji
Wang Huning
Cai Qi
Ding Xuexiang
Li Xi
		
The election of executive leadership in the PRC is done through a process that can best be described as an indirect election. In this system, only one candidate stands for the election of any given position. Although other candidates are not allowed to formally run, write in candidates are permitted. In 2013, when the 12th National People's Congress elected CCP general secretary Xi Jinping as president, 2952 members voted in favor and one against, with three abstentions. Similarly, in the 2008 election, Hu Jintao, then-General Secretary, President and Chairman of the Central Military Commission, was re-elected by a landside. Of the 2985 members of the 11th National People's Congress, only 3 voted against Hu Jintao with another 5 abstaining.

Practical mechanism
In practical terms, the National Congress provides a rubber stamp on a decision that is made by the Politburo and the Standing Committee. The transition of leadership can take several months. For instance, when Hu Jintao took over power from Jiang Zemin, the transition of power stretched out almost two years. Listed below are the dates on which Hu was appointed to each office:
General Secretary of the Chinese Communist Party (November 2002)
President of the People's Republic of China (March 2003)
Chairman of the Central Military Commission (September 2004)
Usually the office of Chairman of the Central Military Commission is the last office handed over by the previous leader, in order to secure political influence and ensure political continuity.

Most recent transition
Appointments to key offices are the best predictor of whom the next leader will be. The office of Vice Chairman of the Central Military Commission (CMC) is seen by many as the last stop before becoming the top leader of China. Appointment to Vice Chairman position is so crucial that when Xi Jinping, the current CCP General Secretary, failed to achieve that office at the 4th Plenum in 2009, many analysts suggested that he had fallen from favor and would not be the next Chinese leader. His ultimate appointment to Vice Chairman of the CMC was seen as evidence that he had begun to consolidate his power and would ultimately succeed Hu Jintao when his term expired in 2012 at the 18th Party Congress. 
 
Absent a transparent electoral process, the appointment to key positions is the only way to predict future leadership in China. Note in the table below, the path that Xi Jinping followed from a low-level party official at the age of 30 to his current position of the leader of the most populous country in the world.

Xi Jinping's Corresponding Political and Military Postings, 1983-2007

As long as the Chinese government remains secretive about the inner workings of the CCP Politburo, past behavior will continue to be the most effective tool for predicting future appointments. In this context, the appointment of a candidate to key offices is still the best indicator of their future role. For example, the appointment of Xi Jinping as the vice chairman of the Central Military Commission of the Chinese Communist Party signposted with a reasonable amount of confidence that he would be the next top leader of the People's Republic of China.

Xi Jinping era

See also 
 List of Chinese leaders
 Paramount leader
 Orders of precedence in China
 Chairman of the Chinese Communist Party
 General Secretary of the Chinese Communist Party
 President of the People's Republic of China
 Premier of the People's Republic of China

References 

Politics of China
Government of China
China history-related lists
Succession